Anastasia Igorevna Dobrinina (born 3 September 1993) is a Russian female badminton player.

Achievements

BWF International Challenge/Series
Women's Doubles

 BWF International Challenge tournament
 BWF International Series tournament
 BWF Future Series tournament

References

External links 

1993 births
Living people
Russian female badminton players
21st-century Russian women